Nordstromia heba is a moth in the family Drepanidae. It was described by Hong-Fu Chu and Lin-Yao Wang in 1988. It is found in Shanxi, China.

Adults can be easily distinguished from other related species by the body size, wing colour pattern, as well as the male genitalia.

References

Moths described in 1988
Drepaninae
Moths of Asia